Velizhsky (masculine), Velizhskaya (feminine), or Velizhskoye (neuter) may refer to:
Velizhsky District, a district of Smolensk Oblast, Russia
Velizhskoye Urban Settlement, an administrative division and a municipal formation which the town of Velizh and seventeen rural localities in Velizhsky District of Smolensk Oblast, Russia are incorporated as